In Exile may refer to:

Film and television
In Exile (film) or Time Runner, a 1993 science fiction film
In Exile (TV series), a 1998 UK sitcom

Literature
"In Exile" (short story), an 1892 short story by Anton Chekhov
In Exile, a 1923 book by John Cournos
In Exile, a 2008 short story collection by Billy O'Callaghan
In Exile, a 1931 poetry collection by Ronald Ross

Music
 In Exile (Sumsion), a 1981 motet by Herbert Sumsion
 In Exile (Michael Patrick Kelly album), 2003
 [In] Exile, an album by After the Fall, 2009
 In Exile, an album by the Gun Club, 1992
 "In Exile", a song by Lisa Gerrard from The Silver Tree, 2006
 "In Exile", a song by Thrice from the album Beggars, 2009
 "In Exile (For Rodrigo Rojas)", a song by the Dream Academy from Remembrance Days, 1987

See also
In Exile Deo, a 2004 album by Juliana Hatfield